"Breaking Up Is Hard to Do" is a song by Neil Sedaka.

Breaking Up Is Hard to Do may also refer to:

 Breaking Up Is Hard to Do (film), a 2010 American romantic comedy
 Breaking Up Is Hard to Do (musical), a 2006 jukebox musical
 "Breaking Up Is Hard to Do" (Roseanne), a 1992 television episode
 "Breaking Up Is Hard to Do (in 22 Minutes)", a 1989 episode of Full House